This is a comprehensive list of the accomplishments and records of the Boston Celtics. The Celtics are an American professional basketball team currently playing in the National Basketball Association.

Playoffs

Championships (17)
The Celtics' 17 NBA Championships are the most of any NBA franchise, tied with the Los Angeles and Minneapolis Lakers. 

1957
1959
1960
1961
1962
1963
1964
1965
1966
1968
1969
1974
1976
1981
1984
1986
2008

Conference titles (22)
 

1957
1958
1959
1960
1961
1962
1963
1964
1965
1966
1968
1969
1974
1976
1981
1984
1985
1986
1987
2008
2010
2022

Division titles (23)
 

1972
1973
1974
1975
1976
1980
1981
1982
1984
1985
1986
1987
1988
1991
1992
2005
2008
2009
2010
2011
2012
2017
2022

Hall of Fame
37 people were inducted in the Naismith Memorial Basketball Hall of Fame as players, 6 – as coaches, 6 – as contributors.

Additionally, Johnny Most and Mike Gorman were honored with the Hall of Fame's Curt Gowdy Media Award. Most was awarded in 1993 for his 37-year career as the Celtics radio announcer, while Gorman was awarded in 2021 for his 40-year career as the Celtics television announcer.

Notes:
 1 In total, Heinsohn was inducted into the Hall of Fame twice – as player and as coach.
 2 In total, Bird was inducted into the Hall of Fame twice – as player and as a member of the 1992 Olympic team.
 3 In total, Russell was inducted into the Hall of Fame twice – as player and as coach.

Retired numbers

The Celtics have retired 23 numbers, the most of any professional sports franchise in North America. 

 1 Also served as head coach (1966–69). Retired league-wide in 2022.
 2 Also served as head coach (1969–78); as broadcaster (1966–1969, 1980–2020).
 3 Also served as head coach (1978).
 4 Also served as head coach (1978–79).
 5 Loscutoff, who wore #18, asked that his legacy be honored by allowing other Celtics to wear his number in the future. On one of the banners of retired numbers at the TD Garden, Loscutoff is represented by a square with the letters "LOSCY". #18 was later retired for Dave Cowens.
 6 Also served as head coach (1983–88).
 7 Also served as broadcaster (1995-present); briefly wore No. 30 in 1977–78.
 8 Died of a heart attack while still playing for the team; number retired posthumously.

Award winners
 

NBA MVP
Bob Cousy – 1957
Bill Russell – 1958, 1961–1963, 1965
Dave Cowens – 1973
Larry Bird – 1984–1986

NBA Eastern Conference Finals MVP
Jayson Tatum – 2022

NBA Finals MVP
John Havlicek – 1974
Jo Jo White – 1976
Cedric Maxwell – 1981
Larry Bird – 1984, 1986
Paul Pierce – 2008

NBA Defensive Player of the Year
Kevin Garnett – 2008
Marcus Smart - 2022

NBA Rookie of the Year
Tom Heinsohn – 1957
Dave Cowens – 1971
Larry Bird – 1980

NBA Sixth Man of the Year
Kevin McHale – 1984, 1985
Bill Walton – 1986

NBA Coach of the Year
Red Auerbach – 1965
Tom Heinsohn – 1973
Bill Fitch – 1980

NBA Executive of the Year
Red Auerbach – 1980
Danny Ainge – 2008

Community Assist Award
Isaiah Thomas – 2017

All-NBA First Team
Ed Sadowski – 1948
Ed Macauley – 1951–1953
Bob Cousy – 1952–1961
Bill Sharman – 1956–1959
Bill Russell – 1959, 1963, 1965
John Havlicek – 1971–1974
Larry Bird – 1980–1988
Kevin McHale – 1987
Kevin Garnett – 2008
Jayson Tatum – 2022

All-NBA Second Team
Bill Sharman – 1953, 1955, 1960
Ed Macauley – 1954
Bill Russell – 1958, 1960–1962, 1964, 1966–1968
Tom Heinsohn – 1961–1964
Bob Cousy – 1962, 1963
John Havlicek – 1964, 1966, 1968–1970, 1975, 1976
Sam Jones – 1965–1967
Dave Cowens – 1973, 1975, 1976
Jo Jo White – 1975, 1977
Nate Archibald – 1981
Robert Parish – 1982
Larry Bird – 1990
Paul Pierce – 2009
Isaiah Thomas – 2017
Kyrie Irving – 2019

All-NBA Third Team
Robert Parish – 1989
Paul Pierce – 2002, 2003, 2008
Rajon Rondo – 2012
Jayson Tatum – 2020

NBA All-Rookie First Team
John Havlicek – 1963
Jo Jo White – 1970
Dave Cowens – 1971
Larry Bird – 1980
Kevin McHale – 1981
Dee Brown – 1991
Antoine Walker – 1997
Ron Mercer – 1998
Paul Pierce – 1999
Jayson Tatum – 2018

NBA All-Rookie Second Team
Brian Shaw – 1989
Rick Fox – 1992
Dino Rađa – 1994
Eric Montross – 1995
J. R. Bremer – 2003
Al Jefferson – 2005
Ryan Gomes – 2006
Rajon Rondo – 2007
Marcus Smart – 2015
Jaylen Brown – 2017

NBA All-Defensive First Team
Bill Russell – 1969
John Havlicek – 1972–1976
Paul Silas – 1975, 1976
Dave Cowens – 1976
Kevin McHale – 1986–1988
Dennis Johnson – 1987
Kevin Garnett – 2008, 2009, 2011
Rajon Rondo – 2010, 2011
Avery Bradley – 2016
Marcus Smart – 2019, 2020, 2022

NBA All-Defensive Second Team
Tom Sanders – 1969
John Havlicek – 1969–1971
Don Chaney – 1972–1975
Dave Cowens – 1975, 1980
Larry Bird – 1982–1984
Kevin McHale – 1983, 1989, 1990
Dennis Johnson – 1984–1986
Rajon Rondo – 2009, 2012
Kevin Garnett –  2012
Avery Bradley – 2013
Al Horford – 2018
Robert Williams III – 2022

NBA All-Star Weekend

All-Star Game selections

 Bob Cousy – 1951–1963
 Ed Macauley – 1951–1956
 Bill Sharman – 1953–1960
 Tom Heinsohn – 1957, 1961–1965
 Bill Russell – 1958–1969
 Sam Jones – 1962, 1964, 1965, 1966, 1968
 John Havlicek – 1966–1978
 Bailey Howell – 1967
 Jo Jo White – 1971–1977
 Dave Cowens – 1972–1978, 1980
 Paul Silas – 1975
 Nate Archibald – 1980, 1981, 1982
 Larry Bird – 1980–1988, 1990, 1991, 1992
 Robert Parish – 1981–1987, 1990, 1991
 Kevin McHale – 1984, 1986–1991

 Dennis Johnson – 1985
 Danny Ainge – 1988
 Reggie Lewis – 1992
 Antoine Walker – 1998, 2002, 2003
 Paul Pierce – 2002–2006, 2008–2012
 Ray Allen – 2008, 2009, 2011
 Kevin Garnett – 2008–2011, 2013
 Rajon Rondo – 2010–2013
 Isaiah Thomas – 2016, 2017
 Al Horford – 2018
 Kyrie Irving – 2018, 2019
 Kemba Walker – 2020
 Jayson Tatum – 2020–2023
 Jaylen Brown – 2021, 2023

NBA All-Star Game head coaches
Red Auerbach – 1957–1967
Tom Heinsohn – 1972–1974, 1976
Bill Fitch – 1982
K. C. Jones – 1984–1987
Chris Ford – 1991
Doc Rivers – 2008, 2011
Brad Stevens – 2017
Joe Mazzulla – 2023

All-Star Most Valuable Player
Ed Macauley – 1951
Bob Cousy – 1954, 1957
Bill Sharman – 1955
Bill Russell – 1963
David Cowens – 1973
Nate Archibald – 1981
Larry Bird - 1982
Jayson Tatum – 2023

Slam Dunk champion
Dee Brown – 1991
Gerald Green – 2007

References

Accomplishments and records
Boston Celtics